Elymus virginicus, or Virginia wildrye, is a perennial bunchgrass located in Virginia and the eastern United States. Virginia wild rye is one of the few cool season native grasses found in the east Texas area. It is extremely palatable to livestock and will decrease without proper grazing management. It spreads via seed and tillering. It can be confused with Canadian wild rye which is a more robust plant with longer awns. It should be cut early in the season when used for hay to avoid ergot contamination. Northern Missouri Germplasm Virginia wild rye was released in 1999 by the Missouri Plant Material Center for use in northern Missouri.

Description

 Native
 Cool season
 Perennial
 Bunch grass
 Variable color, green - silver blue
 2 – 4 feet tall
 Seed head has dense, medium length awns
 Seed head 2 - 6 inches in length

Uses
 Pasture and hay
 Restoration
 Erosion control
 Wildlife habitat
 Buffer strips

Key characteristics

 Seed head remains straight at maturity
 Short, membranous, rigid ligule
 Densely awned, wheat like head
 No hair on stems or leaves
 Color variable, green waxy, blue-green or silver
 Flowers May - July

Distribution
Virginia wildrye is found throughout the eastern 2/3rds of the United States and all of the southern, Canadian provinces. It is typically found in moister sites than Canadian wildrye, and will tolerate more shading. It prefers heavy, fertile soils, but is extremely adaptable.

References

virginicus
Bunchgrasses of North America
Grasses of the United States
Flora of the United States
Plants described in 1753
Taxa named by Carl Linnaeus